Edward Charles Smart (23 August 1946 – 6 February 2000) was a Welsh cyclist and coach from Cardiff, Wales. He represented Wales at the 1966 Commonwealth Games in Kingston, Jamaica (formally the Empire Games), in the scratch race, kilo, sprint, pursuit and road race.

He ran a garage on Maindy Road, opposite the cycle track. Smart coached young riders and was the Welsh Cycling Union's track co-ordinator and member of the Maindy track league committee

Steve Jones and Eddie Smart were helpers at the Junior Tour of Wales. They died in a car accident on the M4 in Berkshire. John Richards, the race's organizer a shield to them for the best Welsh rider. It is awarded annually at the Junior Tour of Wales.
 The Eddie Smart Memorial Fund was set up to refurbish the track.

Palmarès

15th Kilo, Commonwealth Games

References

1946 births
2000 deaths
Welsh male cyclists
Cyclists at the 1966 British Empire and Commonwealth Games
Commonwealth Games competitors for Wales
Road incident deaths in England
Sportspeople from Cardiff